The 1935 college football season was the last one before the Associated Press writers' poll was used in selecting the national champion. There were seven contemporary math system selectors that year who are informally recognized by the NCAA as "nationwide in scope". The Dickinson System, run by University of Illinois Professor Frank Dickinson, selected Southern Methodist University (SMU) as best in the nation. The Houlgate System, created by Carroll Everard "Deke" Houlgate Sr., also selected SMU. The contemporary Boand, Litkenhous and Poling math rating systems all selected Minnesota as the No. 1 team in the nation. The Dunkel System selected Princeton as its top team. The Williamson System, by Paul O. Williamson of New Orleans, ranked Texas Christian University first. A poll of newspaper writers, taken at year's end—by United Press rather than the AP—concluded that Minnesota was the best in the nation.

The 1935 season also marked the first time the Heisman Trophy was awarded. It was won by Jay Berwanger of Chicago.  Quarterback Ray Zeh of Case Western Reserve led the nation in scoring.

Conference and program changes

September
September 21  SMU opened with a 39–0 win over North Texas and TCU opened its season with a 41–0 win over visiting Howard Payne College.

September 28
SMU beat Austin College 60–0 and TCU beat North Texas 28–11.  Stanford beat San Jose State 35–0 and UCLA beat Utah State 39–0.,
Fordham University, whose 1936 team would include the legendary Seven Blocks of Granite was a favorite New York City college football teams, after New York University and Columbia University.  The Rams played all of their games at home at the Polo Grounds, which also hosted the NFL's New york Giants.  In a game against visiting Franklin & Marshall, the Rams were losing until they scored two touchdowns in the fourth quarter for a 14–7 win.  California played a doubleheader, beating UC-Davis 47–0 and Whittier 6–0.
Notre Dame defeated visiting Kansas, 28–7.  Pittsburgh had an unexpectedly difficult time in a 14–0 win over visiting Waynesburg College.

October

October 5
Minnesota beat visiting North Dakota State 26–6
Stanford won at the U. of San Francisco 10–0 and California beat St. Mary's 10–0.  In Portland, UCLA beat Oregon State 20–7.
Ohio State beat Kentucky 19–6
Princeton edged Penn 7–6, Fordham beat Boston College 19–0,  Notre Dame won at Carnegie Tech, 14–3 and Pittsburgh won at Washington & Jefferson 35–0.  TCU won at Arkansas 13–7 and SMU beat visiting Tulsa 14–0.

October 12
Minnesota won at Nebraska 12–7 and Ohio State defeated visiting Drake 85–7.  In Portland, California beat Oregon, 6–0.
TCU won at Tulsa, 13–0.  In St. Louis, SMU beat Washington University 35–6.
Notre Dame won at Wisconsin, 27–0  Pittsburgh beat West Virginia, 24–6.  Fordham lost to Purdue, 20–0  
Princeton defeated Williams College, 14–7.

October 19
UCLA won at Stanford, 7–6.
Notre Dame (3–0) and Pittsburgh, both 3–0–0, met at South Bend, with the Fighting Irish handing Pitt its first loss, 9–6.
Minnesota beat visiting Tulane 20–0
Ohio State beat Northwestern 28–7.
SMU and Rice, both 4–0–0, met in Dallas, with SMU winning, 10–0.
TCU beat visiting Texas A&M 19–14 to stay unbeaten.  California beat Santa Clara 6–0.  Princeton beat Rutgers, 29–6.
Fordham beat Vanderbilt, 13–7

October 26
TCU won at Centenary, 27–7.
Stanford won at Washington 6–0, California beat visiting USC, 21–7, and UCLA beat Oregon, 33–6.
Minnesota beat Northwestern at home 21–13 and Ohio State won at Indiana 28–6
Fordham defeated Lebanon Valley College 15–0.  Pittsburgh beat Penn State 9–0.  Princeton won at Cornell 54–0.  At Baltimore, Notre Dame beat Navy 14–0.  In a game at Wichita Falls, Texas, SMU beat Hardin–Simmons 18–6.

November
November 2  Notre Dame (5–0–0) and Ohio State (4–0–0) met at Columbus before a crowd of 80,000.  Grantland Rice described what happened: "Completely outplayed in the first two quarters, trailing 13 to 0 as the final quarter started with every killing break against it-- breaks that would crack the heart of an iron ox-- this Notre Dame team came surging back in the final quarter...".  Notre Dame scored early in the fourth, but the extra point attempt bounced off the crossbar, and it was 13–6.  After an interception, the Irish drove to within six inches of the goal line 0when Milner fumbled the ball away.  With 90 seconds left, Andy Pilney passed to Mike Layden for a touchdown, but the extra point failed and the Irish trailed 13–12.  Andy Pilney forced a Buckeye fumble at midfield, giving the Irish the ball at the 49 yard line, and on the next play, Pilney, taking back over as quarterback, scrambled to the 19 yard line, but was injured.  With only one play left in the game, reserve quarterback Bill Shakespeare passed to Wayne Milner for the 18–13 win.

At Los Angeles, California (6–0–0) faced UCLA (4–0–0) and won 14–2.
TCU visited  Baylor (6–0–0).  TCU shut the Bears out 28–0.
SMU beat visiting Texas 20–0.  Minnesota beat Purdue 29–7.
Stanford beat Santa Clara in another close game, 9–6.  Fordham and Pittsburgh played to a 0–0 tie.  Princeton defeated Navy 26–0.

November 9  Unbeaten Notre Dame hosted the Northwestern Wildcats, who had a losing record (2–3–0).  With William Shakespeare at left halfback for the Irish, and Henry Wardsworth Longfellow playing right end for the Wildcats, the game looked like no more than a meeting of literary namesakes.  Shakespeare's running game was shut down, while Longfellow caught one touchdown pass, and then recovered a fumble in the fourth quarter to set up a second touchdown for a major upset, as Northwestern won 14–7   Minnesota won at Iowa 13–6.  In Los Angeles, SMU handed UCLA (4–1–0) its second straight loss, 21–0.  Stanford won at USC, 3–0.  California beat Washington 14–0.

Fordham tied St. Mary's College 7–7, Princeton beat Harvard 35–0 and Pittsburgh beat visiting Army 29–6.  Ohio State won at Chicago, 20–13.  In a Friday game at New Orleans, TCU beat Loyola College 14–0.

November 16

TCU won at Texas 28–0 and SMU won at Arkansas 17–6.
Fordham beat Muhlenberg College 45–0 at the Polo Grounds, while Notre Dame and Army played to a 6–6 tie at Yankee Stadium.
Pittsburgh beat Nebraska 6–0 and Princeton beat Lehigh 27–0.
Stanford defeated Montana 32–0  California beat Pacific 39–0
Ohio State beat Illinois 38–0 and Minnesota won at Michigan 40–0
In a Friday game, UCLA beat visiting Hawaii 19–6.

November 23

California (9–0) and Stanford (6–1–0) met at Palo Alto, as Stanford handed the Golden Bears their first loss, 13–0.  On the strength of the win, Stanford got the bid to the Rose Bowl.  In a matchup of two great Ivy teams, Princeton (7–0–0) hosted Dartmouth (8–0–0), with Princeton winning 26–6.
SMU defeated visiting Baylor 10–0 and TCU beat visiting Rice, 27–6, as both teams raised their records to 10–0–0.

UCLA beat Loyola Marymount 14–6
Notre Dame closed its season with a 20–13 win over USC.
Minnesota beat visiting Wisconsin, 33–7 to close its season at 8–0–0.

For the first time, Ohio State closed with its regular season with Michigan, a tradition that continued with only one interruption, in 1942.  OSU won at Ann Arbor, 38–0.

On Thanksgiving Day, November 28 a crowd of 78,000 turned out at Yankee Stadium to watch Fordham (5–1–2) face New York University (7–1–0).  Fordham shut out NYU 21–0, but not before a fight broke out with the spectators crowding the field,  Pittsburgh (6–1–0) and Carnegie Tech (2–5–0) played to a 0–0 tie.

November 30

The most eagerly watched game of the season matched two unbeaten (10–0–0) teams, with Texas Christian (10–0–0) hosting Southern Methodist.  SMU won 20–14 and was invited to the Rose Bowl, while TCU went to the Sugar Bowl.

Princeton closed its season with a 38–7 win at Yale, to finish 9–0–0.

December
December 7 UCLA beat Idaho 13–6.  TCU won at Santa Clara, 10–6.

December 14 In San Francisco, UCLA closed its season with a 13–7 win over St. Mary's, while in Los Angeles, Pittsburgh beat USC 12–7.

Conference standings

Major conference standings

Independents

Minor conferences

Minor conference standings

Rankings

Dickinson System
The AP sportswriters' poll did not begin continuously until 1936. (although, the first time was a one instance publishing in 1934)  Frank G. Dickinson, an economics professor at the University of Illinois, had invented the Dickinson System to rank colleges based upon their records and the strength of their opposition.  The Rissman Trophy, and later the Rockne Memorial Trophy, was awarded to the winning university.

In an AP story with the caption "Figure This Out!", the system was explained:
"For each victory of a first division team over another first division team, the winner gets 30 points and the loser 15 points.  For each tie between two first
division teams, each team gets 12.5 points.  For each victory of a first division team over a second division team, the first division winner gets 20 points and the second division loser 10 points.  For each tie between two second
division teams, each gets 15 points.  For each tie between a non-division team and a second division team, the first division team gets 15 points and the second division
team gets 20 points.  Then, after each team has been given its quota of points its final "score" is tabulated by taking an average on the number of games played."

Final Dickinson rankings
SMU, Minnesota, and Princeton were all unbeaten and untied at season's end.  Based on the strength of its schedule, which included 12 games, SMU was ranked first.  Professor Dickinson also had additional variables, based on the strength of the conferences, reported as follows: Big Ten (+3.78), SWC (+3.31), East (0.00), Pacific Coast (-0.11), SEC (-0.12), Big Six (-1.95) and Southern (-6.15)

The United Press Sports Writers' Poll
The AP began the first weekly writers' poll in 1936 and the United Press (UP) did not begin a weekly poll until 1950. The UP did conduct a season's end poll in 1935.  Writers from 112 papers were asked to vote for their Top Ten and then the choices were to be weighted, with 10 points for first, 9 points for second, etc.  The results placed Minnesota first and SMU second

Bowl games

Rankings from the Dickinson System

The Rose Bowl matched unbeaten Southwest Conference champion SMU (12–0) against Pacific Coast Conference co-champion Stanford (7–1) before a crowd of 86,000.  Stanford has lost the two previous Rose Bowls, falling to Columbia in the 1934 Rose Bowl and 1934 Alabama Crimson Tide football team the 1935 game.  Determined not three-peat, the Stanford scored an early touchdown and held off the Mustangs to win 7–0.

In New Orleans, the second annual Sugar Bowl pitted TCU (11–1) against Southeastern Conference champion LSU (9–1) before a crowd of 38,000.  TCU's Sammy Baugh was forced out of the end zone on a pass attempt, and the safety gave LSU a 2–0 lead.  Two minutes later, Baugh drove the Frogs to the 17-yard line, setting up Taldon Malton's field goal.  The final score was TCU 3, LSU 2 

In Miami, the second annual Orange Bowl matched Ole Miss (9–2) against unheralded Catholic University (8–1).  A crowd of 10,000 watched Catholic take an early lead and pull off a 20–19 upset.  The Sun Bowl matched two colleges for the first time, as New Mexico A&M and Hardin–Simmons battled to a 14–14 tie.

Awards and honors

All-Americans

Statistical leaders
 Points scored: Ray Zeh, Case Western Reserve, 112

Heisman Trophy

1935 was the first year that the Heisman Trophy was ever awarded, although it was named differently in the first year. In 1935, it was presented by the Downtown Athletic Club (DAC) in Manhattan, New York, a privately owned recreation facility near the site of the former World Trade Center. It was first known simply as the "DAC Trophy" for this inaugural year. The first winner, Jay Berwanger of the University of Chicago, was drafted by the Philadelphia Eagles but declined to sign for them. He never played professional football for any team. In 1936, John Heisman died and the trophy was renamed in his honor. Larry Kelley, the second winner of the award was the first man to win it officially named as the "Heisman Trophy."

Voting

See also
 1935 College Football All-America Team

References